Robert Joseph Pastorelli (June 21, 1954 – March 8, 2004) was an American actor.

After he acquired a reputation as a skilled character actor in the 1980s and 1990s, Pastorelli's career went into decline after the death of his girlfriend under mysterious circumstances at his home in 1999. He died of a narcotic overdose in 2004. He was best known as Eldin in Murphy Brown (1988–1994), Johnny C. in Eraser (1996), and Hughey in Michael (1996).

Early life
Pastorelli was born in New Brunswick, New Jersey, the son of Ledo ("Tally") Pastorelli, an insurance salesman and Dorothy ("Dottie"), an artist. His sister, Gwen Pastorelli, is an opera singer and a real estate agent.

He spent his childhood years in Edison, New Jersey, graduating from Edison High School in 1972. He initially intended a career as a professional boxer, but had to abandon the sport due to injuries sustained in a near-fatal high-speed car crash at the age of 19 (he later claimed that he had a "near death" incident at this time, and that he had experienced himself looking down from above upon his body in the hospital bed with his father at the bedside overcome with grief). He acquired a narcotic habit in his early twenties prior to his acting career that he overcame, but he would relapse throughout his later life.

Theater career
He entered the acting profession via New York City theater in the late 1970s after studying at the New York Academy of Theatrical Arts and the Actors Studio, financially maintaining himself by working as a bartender. In 1977 he made his stage debut in a production of Rebel Without a Cause. He also performed in productions of The Rainmaker, and Death of a Salesman. Later in his career he performed at London's South Bank theater in A Streetcar Named Desire in 2002.

Hollywood
In 1982 Pastorelli headed west to Los Angeles seeking opportunities in Hollywood. Spending the early 1980s employed in television bit-part appearances, he found a niche playing streetwise characters, appearing also in supporting roles in the cinema films Outrageous Fortune (1987) and Beverly Hills Cop II (1987). His first substantial cinematic role came with Dances with Wolves (1990). His big break in television came with the role of the gruff but lovable house painter Eldin Bernecky on the series Murphy Brown, which was a ratings hit, and he stayed with the show for seven seasons from 1988 to 1994. Murphy Brown producer Diane English was sufficiently impressed with his abilities that she worked with him to produce his first starring vehicle, the television sitcom Double Rush which lasted one season in 1995. Two years later, he starred in the American adaptation of the British detective series Cracker (1997–1999).

As his television career gained momentum Pastorelli's opportunities in cinema roles increased: Sister Act 2: Back in the Habit (1993); a career defining performance playing a demented serial killer in the 1993 murder mystery thriller Striking Distance (although the movie was not a commercial success); Eraser (1996), Michael (1996), and Modern Vampires (1998).

Charemon Jonovich shooting
On the evening of March 15, 1999, during an incident at his Hollywood home, Pastorelli's 25-year-old girlfriend, Charemon Jonovich, was killed by a gunshot to the head. During the authorities' investigation that followed, Pastorelli testified that in the midst of an argument between the two of them, she suddenly produced a handgun and killed herself. The incident was investigated as an accident or suicide, and the Los Angeles Coroner's Office declared the cause of death undetermined.

Final years
Pastorelli was exonerated of responsibility for Charemon Jonovich's death and received public expressions of sympathy within Hollywood and from the Los Angeles media, but his career went into noticeable decline afterwards. He appeared in two more cinema productions in small roles in the early 2000s as well as some minor supporting roles in television productions. He developed a friendship with Glenn Close towards the end of his career, and appeared alongside her in the television films The Ballad of Lucy Whipple, and in South Pacific in 2001.  In 2002 he again appeared alongside her at London's Royal National Theatre in a performance of Tennessee Williams' A Streetcar Named Desire. In 2002 he co-founded the Garden State Film Festival. His posthumous final screen appearance was in the movie Be Cool (2005).

Death
Pastorelli was found dead at the age of 49 at his home in the Hollywood Hills on March 8, 2004, from a narcotics overdose. At the time of his death he had been forewarned that authorities were planning on arresting him for further questioning regarding the shooting of Charemon Jonovich in March 1999. A review of the original evidence had resulted in her death being reclassified as a homicide, with Pastorelli being identified as a suspect for further investigation. The Coroner's Office reported Pastorelli died of a "fatal blood concentration of morphine". Pastorelli's body was interred in the mausoleum at Saint Catharine's Cemetery in Sea Girt, New Jersey.

Personal life 
Pastorelli had two daughters, Gianna Li Pastorelli (born February 6, 1998) with Charemon Jonovich, and Giannina Marie Pastorelli (born March 6, 2000) with his then-girlfriend, Jalee Carder.

Filmography

Film

Television

See also

 List of people who died on the toilet
 Toilet-related injuries and deaths

References

External links
 
 

1954 births
2004 deaths
American male film actors
American male television actors
Drug-related deaths in California
Male actors from New Jersey
American people of Italian descent
People from Edison, New Jersey
People from New Brunswick, New Jersey
20th-century American male actors
Edison High School (New Jersey) alumni